Darshan Nalkande (born 4 October 1998) is an Indian cricketer. He made his List A debut for Vidarbha in the 2018–19 Vijay Hazare Trophy on 2 October 2018. He made his first-class debut for Vidarbha in the 2018–19 Ranji Trophy on 1 November 2018.

In December 2018, he was bought by the Punjab Kings in the player auction for the 2019 Indian Premier League (IPL). He made his Twenty20 debut for Vidarbha in the 2018–19 Syed Mushtaq Ali Trophy on 21 February 2019. In February 2022, he was bought by the Gujarat Titans in the auction for the 2022 Indian Premier League tournament. In April 2022, he made his IPL debut against Punjab Kings.

References

External links
 

1998 births
Living people
Indian cricketers
Gujarat Titans cricketers
Vidarbha cricketers
People from Wardha